Gangajamuna (Nepali: गंगाजमुना; gangajamuna) is a Gaupalika(Nepali: गाउपालिका ; gaupalika) Formerly: village development committee) in Dhading District in the Bagmati Province of central Nepal. The local body was formed by merging five VDCs namely Rigaun, Gumdi, Phulkharka, Baseri and Budhathum. Currently, it has a total of 7 wards, larger VDCS Gumdi, and Rigaun are divided in 2 wards each whereas other VDCs are divided into only one ward. The population of the rural municipality is 21,784 according to the data collected on 2017 Nepalese local elections.

Demographics
At the time of the 2011 Nepal census, Gangajamuna Rural Municipality had a population of 21,784. Of these, 49.0% spoke Nepali, 30.0% Tamang, 11.4% Gurung, 9.2% Ghale, 0.2% Newar and 0.2% other languages as their first language.

In terms of ethnicity/caste, 30.0% were Tamang, 18.9% Chhetri, 13.7% Gurung, 11.4% Ghale, 6.7% Hill Brahmin, 4.9% Newar, 4.4% Kami, 4.3% Magar, 2.9% Sarki, 1.9% Damai/Dholi, 0.4% Gharti/Bhujel, 0.3% Rai, 0.1% Musalman and 0.1% others.

In terms of religion, 48.6% were Hindu, 32.7% Buddhist, 18.6% Christian and 0.1% Muslim.

In terms of literacy, 59.7% could both read and write, 1.6% could read but not write and 38.8% could neither read nor write.

Population 

See also
Dhading District

References

Populated places in Dhading District
Rural municipalities in Dhading District
Rural municipalities of Nepal established in 2017